Grace Birungi (born 10 October 1973) is an Ugandan runner who specialized in the 800 metres and to a lesser extent 400 metres.

She won a silver medal in 400 m at the 1996 African Championships in Yaoundé and a bronze medal in 800 m at the 1999 All-Africa Games in Johannesburg. Participating in the 2000 Summer Olympics, she achieved fifth place in her 800 m heat, thus failing to make it through to the second round.

External links

1973 births
Living people
Ugandan female middle-distance runners
Athletes (track and field) at the 1998 Commonwealth Games
Athletes (track and field) at the 2002 Commonwealth Games
Commonwealth Games competitors for Uganda
Athletes (track and field) at the 1996 Summer Olympics
Athletes (track and field) at the 2000 Summer Olympics
Olympic athletes of Uganda
African Games bronze medalists for Uganda
African Games medalists in athletics (track and field)
Athletes (track and field) at the 1999 All-Africa Games
20th-century Ugandan women
21st-century Ugandan women